Melliniella is a monotypic genus of flowering plants in the legume family, Fabaceae found in western Africa. It belongs to the subfamily Faboideae. Its only species is Melliniella micrantha.

References 

Desmodieae
Fabaceae genera